Loughnan is a surname. Notable people with this surname include:

 Austin Loughnan (1851–1926), Australian sportsman
 Col Loughnan (born 1942), Australian jazz saxophonist
 George Loughnan (1842–1896), Australian politician
 Jack Loughnan (1889–1949), Australian rules football player
 Robert Loughnan (1841–1934), New Zealand farmer, journalist and politician